Richard Olmsted may refer to:
 Richard Olmsted (artist)
 Richard Olmsted (settler)